David Rollinson  (born 11 January 1947) is a former British international cyclist. He competed in the individual road race at the 1968 Summer Olympics.

He also represented England in the road race, at the 1970 British Commonwealth Games in Edinburgh, Scotland, where he just finished outside the medals in fourth place.

References

External links
 

1947 births
Living people
British male cyclists
Olympic cyclists of Great Britain
Cyclists at the 1968 Summer Olympics
Sportspeople from Liverpool
Cyclists at the 1970 British Commonwealth Games
Commonwealth Games competitors for England